Patrick Mwachiko (born 1948) was the Anglican Bishop of Masasi: he retired in 2013.

References

Anglican bishops of Masasi
20th-century Anglican bishops in Tanzania
21st-century Anglican bishops in Tanzania
1948 births
Living people